

1880–81 season

Season 1880–81 was the eighth season of competitive football by Kilmarnock.

Overview
Kilmarnock entered the Scottish Cup for the eighth time and also competed in the Ayrshire Cup. For the first time, Killie reached the third round of the Scottish Cup following a walkover against Stewarton Cunninghame in the first round and a 6–3 win against Ayr in the second round. A 3–3 draw against Mauchline set up third round replay in which Kilmarnock lost 3–0 at Rugby Park. In the first round of the Ayrshire Cup, Kilmarnock drew 2–2 with Barkip before winning the replay 7–0 in at Rugby Park. Kilmarnock required a second replay to see off Cronberry Eglinton after 5–5 and 2–2 draws before they lost 5–0 to Coylton Coila in the third round.

During the club's early years, the team would play in Oxford blue shirts, white shorts and Oxford blue socks. The now traditional blue and white vertical stripes weren't introduced until 1896.

Scottish Cup

Notes

Ayrshire Cup

1881–82 season

Season 1881–82 was the ninth season of competitive football by Kilmarnock.

Overview
Kilmarnock entered the Scottish Cup for the ninth time and also competed in the Ayrshire Cup and the Kilmarnock Merchants' Charity Cup. In the Scottish Cup, they defeated Largs Athletic 6–0 in the first round before defeating Auchinleck Boswell 7–1 to go through to the third round for the second consecutive season. Kilmarnock then won 2–0 against Kilbirnie to reach the fourth round for the first time. They progressed even further after beating Dundee Our Boys 9–2 before losing 4–1 to Arthurlie in the fifth round.

In the Ayrshire Cup, Kilmarnock reached the final for the first time. A 2–0 win against Kilbirnie in the first round was followed up by away wins against Rankinston and Beith Thistle. Kilmarnock won their fourth round match against Lanemark 3–0 before they were given a bye in the semi-finals. The final was an all-Kilmarnock affair as Kilmarnock met Kilmarnock Portland at the neutral Holm Quarry. Playing in their first-ever cup final on 25 March 1882, Kilmarnock lost 4–0 as Portland won the Ayrshire Cup for the first time.

Lugar Boswell were the opponents for Kilmarnock's first tie in the Kilmarnock Merchants' Charity Cup but the match ended in disappointment as Lugar won 4–0 at Rugby Park.

Scottish Cup

Ayrshire Cup

Notes

Kilmarnock Merchants' Charity Cup

Friendly

1882–83 season

Season 1882–83 was the 10th season of competitive football by Kilmarnock.

Overview
Kilmarnock entered the Scottish Cup for the 10th time and also competed in the Ayrshire Cup and the Kilmarnock Merchants' Charity Cup. In the Scottish Cup, they defeated Mauchline 2–0 in the first round before they were eliminated by Hurlford following a 6–2 defeat. Hurlford also knocked Kilmarnock out of the Ayrshire Cup in the third round while Annbank defeated Killie in the first round of the Kilmarnock Merchants' Charity Cup.

Scottish Cup

Ayrshire Cup

Kilmarnock Merchants' Charity Cup

1883–84 season

Season 1883–84 was the 11th season of competitive football by Kilmarnock.

Overview
Kilmarnock entered the Scottish Cup for the 11th time and also competed in the Ayrshire Cup and Kilmarnock Merchants' Charity Cup. A walkover win came in the first round of the Scottish Cup as Kilbirnie failed to raise a team. In the second round, Kilmarnock saw off Hurlford 3–0 before they were eliminated in the third round by Thornliebank in a match that had to be replayed after the original result was declared void.

In the Ayrshire Cup, Kilmarnock reached the final for the second time after a walkover against Kilmarnock Portland was followed by wins against Maybole, Lugar Boswell and Kilmarnock Athletic. Hurlford were their opponents in the final at Holm Quarry on 22 March 1884 but the teams couldn't be separated as the game ended 2–2. However, Kilmarnock edged the replay two weeks later at the same venue to win the Ayrshire Cup for the first time.

There was also success in the Kilmarnock Merchants' Charity Cup as Kilmarnock defeated Hurlford in a third competition after a 5–1 win at Holm Quarry in the final on 31 May 1884.

Scottish Cup

Notes

Ayrshire Cup

Kilmarnock Merchants' Charity Cup

1884–85 season

Season 1884–85 was the 12th season of competitive football by Kilmarnock.

Overview
Kilmarnock entered the Scottish Cup for the 12th time and also competed in the Ayrshire Cup, the Kilmarnock Merchants' Charity Cup and - for the first time - the Ayr Charity Cup. In the Scottish Cup, Kilmarnock were involved in a controversial first round tie. Kilmarnock initially defeated Hurlford 6–1 at Drumbiehill Park but a protest over a breach of registration rules was upheld and the result was declared void. The match was replayed and this time Hurlford won 3–1, however a similar protest by Kilmarnock was also upheld and Hurlford were disqualified from the competition. In the second round, Killie lost 4–1 to Annbank at Pebble Park.

A successful Ayrshire Cup campaign started with wins over Monkcastle and Lugar Boswell before Kilmarnock received a bye to the semi-finals. On 31 January 1885, Kilmarnock thumped Ayr 5–2 at Rugby Park to reach the final for the second consecutive season. They retained the cup after defeating Hurlford 2–0 in the final at Holm Quarry.

The two charity cups saw similar fates for Kilmarnock. In the final of the Kilmarnock Merchants' Charity Cup, they lost 3–2 to Ayr at Rugby Park before losing to the same team in the Ayr Charity Cup final.

Scottish Cup

Notes

Ayrshire Cup

Kilmarnock Merchants' Charity Cup

Ayr Charity Cup

1885–86 season

Season 1885–86 was the 13th season of competitive football by Kilmarnock.

Overview
Kilmarnock entered the Scottish Cup for the 13th time and also competed in the Ayrshire Cup and Kilmarnock Merchants' Charity Cup. In the first round of the Scottish Cup, Kilmarnock easily saw off Annbank with a 7–1 win at Rugby Park. Their second round tie against Hurlford was more of a marathon after one match was declared void, two were drawn and one abandoned before the tie was finally settled six weeks after the original match. Hurlford won through with a 5–1 victory in the fifth match on 14 November 1885.

A third successive Ayrshire Cup triumph began with an 8–1 win over Maybole in the second round after Kilmarnock received a bye in the first round. The third round saw a 7–0 win over Annbank on Boxing Day 1885 following a protested match that Kilmarnock had won 5–0. Lanemark were defeated 3–1 in the semi-finals before Killie retained the trophy with a 2–1 win against Ayr in the final.

The Kilmarnock Merchants' Charity Cup also saw Kilmarnock end with a 100% record after they defeated Kilmarnock Britannia, Kilbirnie and Ayr to lift the cup for the second time in three seasons.

Scottish Cup

Notes

Ayrshire Cup

Notes

Kilmarnock Merchants' Charity Cup

1886–87 season

Season 1886–87 was the 14th season of competitive football by Kilmarnock.

Overview
Kilmarnock entered the Scottish Cup for the 14th time and also competed in the Ayrshire Cup and Kilmarnock Merchants' Charity Cup. In the Scottish Cup, Cumnock scratched the first round tie giving Kilmarnock a walkover victory. A club record 10–2 win was recorded against Lanemark in the second round and this was followed by a 7–2 win against Lugar Boswell in the third round. A bye in the fourth round then saw Kilmarnock defeat Dunblane 6–0 in the fifth round before the journey came to an end in the quarter-finals with a 5–0 loss to Queen's Park.

There was a similar start in the Ayrshire Cup when Girvan scratched from their first round tie. However, Killie's quest for a fourth consecutive Ayrshire Cup win was ended in the second round when they lost 2–1 to Hurlford. They did reach the final of the Kilmarnock Merchants' Charity Cup but it was Ayr who had their name on the trophy after the competition committee decided to play the final second replay at Beresford Park in Ayr, the home of Ayr Parkhouse. Kilmarnock refused to play the match and Ayr were awarded the trophy.

Scottish Cup

Ayrshire Cup

Kilmarnock Merchants' Charity Cup

Notes

1887–88 season

Season 1887–88 was the 15th season of competitive football by Kilmarnock.

Overview
Kilmarnock entered the Scottish Cup for the 15th time and also competed in the Ayrshire Cup, Kilmarnock Merchants' Charity Cup and Ayr Charity Cup. The first round of the Scottish Cup saw an 8–2 win against Ayr Thistle at Rugby Park. Kilmarnock received a bye in the second round and In the third round, Killie drew 2–2 against Dykebar before winning the replay 9–1. The fourth round saw Kilmarnock knocked out by Partick Thistle after a replay.

In the first round of the Ayrshire Cup, Kilmarnock set a new record for the club's biggest victory when they defeated Burnfoothill 13–0. It was only the second time the team had scored 10 or more goals in a single game. Maybole – a team who Kilmarnock would also put 13 goals past in the Kilmarnock Merchants' Charity Cup later in the season – were defeated 2–0 in the second round before Kilmarnock's Ayrshire Cup journey was ended by a 2–1 defeat to Kilbirnie at Parkfoot.

There were contrasting fates in the two charity cup competitions despite reaching the final in both. Kilmarnock lifted the Ayr Charity Cup for the first time after thumping Ayr 5–1 but the final of the Kilmarnock Merchants' Charity Cup went unplayed after Kilmarnock refused to play just five days after their semi-final replay victory over Kilmarnock Thistle. As a result, the cup was awarded to Hurlford.

For the first time, Kilmarnock played in vertical stripes however these were black and white rather than the now-traditional blue and white stripes which were first introduced in 1896.

Scottish Cup

Ayrshire Cup

Kilmarnock Merchants' Charity Cup

Notes

Ayr Charity Cup

1888–89 season

Season 1888–89 was the 16th season of competitive football by Kilmarnock.

Overview
Kilmarnock entered the Scottish Cup for the 16th time and also competed in the Ayrshire Cup, Kilmarnock Merchants' Charity Cup, Ayr Charity Cup and Glasgow Exhibition Cup.

In the early-season Glasgow Exhibition Trophy - a one-off tournament held to coincide with the International Exhibition of Science, Art and Industry - Kilmarnock lost their first round tie to Kilbirnie in a replay. It would be the first of four tournaments that Kilbirnie would eliminate Kilmarnock from over the season.

The Scottish Cup was the second of them. After a convincing 5–0 first round win against Lugar Boswell, Killie lost 3–1 at home against Kilbirnie in the second round.

Kilmarnock were involved in a marathon of an Ayrshire Cup campaign which saw them play nine matches before being eliminated in the semi-finals. An 11–1 first round win over Stewarton Cunninghame was followed by a 4–0 win over Mauchline in the second round. After two draws and a protested match, Kilmarnock eventually saw off Irvine in the third round with a 3–0 win at the neutral Somerset Park. The semi-final against Hurlford also reached a second replay after two draws but this time it was Hurlford who would advance with a 3–1 win.

In both charity cup competitions, Kilmarnock were due to play Kilbirnie in the semi-finals. However, after Ayr and Hurlford were disqualified from Kilmarnock Merchants' Charity Cup, the semi-final tie became the final. Kilbirnie won 4–2 to lift the trophy and then, just a week later, they also knocked Kilmarnock out of the Ayr Charity Cup.

Scottish Cup

Ayrshire Cup

Notes

Kilmarnock Merchants' Charity Cup

Notes

Ayr Charity Cup

Glasgow Exhibition Cup

1889–90 season

Season 1889–90 was the 17th season of competitive football by Kilmarnock.

Overview
Kilmarnock entered the Scottish Cup for the 17th time and also competed in the Ayrshire Cup and Kilmarnock Merchants' Charity Cup. In all three competitions, Kilmarnock were eliminated by Annbank in their first match.

Scottish Cup

Ayrshire Cup

Kilmarnock Merchants' Charity Cup

References

1880–81 season
1880–81 in Scottish football
1881–82 in Scottish football
1882–83 in Scottish football
1883–84 in Scottish football
1884–85 in Scottish football
1885–86 in Scottish football
1886–87 in Scottish football
1887–88 in Scottish football
1888–89 in Scottish football
1889–90 in Scottish football
Scottish football clubs 1880–81 season
Scottish football clubs 1881–82 season
Scottish football clubs 1882–83 season
Scottish football clubs 1883–84 season
Scottish football clubs 1884–85 season
Scottish football clubs 1885–86 season
Scottish football clubs 1886–87 season
Scottish football clubs 1887–88 season
Scottish football clubs 1888–89 season
Scottish football clubs 1889–90 season